Wasiu Ipaye (born 6 July 1968) is a Nigerian footballer. He played in three matches for the Nigeria national football team from 1989 to 1995. He was also named in Nigeria's squad for the 1990 African Cup of Nations tournament.

References

1968 births
Living people
Nigerian footballers
Nigeria international footballers
1990 African Cup of Nations players
Place of birth missing (living people)
Association football midfielders